Nila Pennae is a 1990 Indian Tamil-language film written and directed by V. Thamilazhagan and produced by R. M. Veerappan. The film stars Divya Bharti, Anand and Sidhant Mohapatra with Vennira Aadai Moorthy and Janagaraj in supporting roles. It was released on 5 July 1990.

Plot 

Krishnamoorthy lives in the city and decides to stay in a village within a forest for some time. As he is very stressed due to the city life, he meets an old guru woman who creates a girl for him. Krishnamoorthy falls in love immediately and so does the girl whom he calls Suriya. She goes on to show him the beauty of life.

Cast 
Anand as Krishnamoorthy
Divya Bharti as Suriya
Sidhant Mohapatra as Soorya
Vennira Aadai Moorthy
Janagaraj

Soundtrack 
The music was composed by Vidyasagar.

Release and reception 
Nila Pennae was released on 5 July 1990, delayed from June. NKS of The Indian Express appreciated Divya Bharti and the music, but criticised the acting of the others. P. S. S. of Kalki wondered who would be guilty of derailing a wonderful film that started out as a highly award-winning feature for box-office collection purposes or anything else, but praised the cinematography.

References

External links 
 

1990 films
1990s Tamil-language films
Films scored by Vidyasagar